Gottfried Leonhard (March 14, 1895 – October 7, 1983) was a German politician of the Christian Democratic Union (CDU) and member of the German Bundestag.

Life 
Leonhard was a co-founder of the CDU in Pforzheim in 1945 and was at times the district chairman of the CDU there. After the Second World War, he was initially a member of the city council of Pforzheim. He was a member of the state parliament of Württemberg-Baden for constituency 24 (Pforzheim) from 1946 to 1950.

Leonhard was a member of the German Bundestag from 1949 to 1965 and represented the constituency of Karlsruhe-Land as a directly elected member. From 21 May 1953 until the end of the first legislative period, he was deputy chairman of the Bundestag Committee for Postal and Telecommunications Affairs.

Literature

References

1895 births
1983 deaths
Members of the Bundestag for Baden-Württemberg
Members of the Bundestag 1961–1965
Members of the Bundestag 1957–1961
Members of the Bundestag 1953–1957
Members of the Bundestag 1949–1953
Members of the Bundestag for the Christian Democratic Union of Germany
Members of the Landtag of Württemberg